The Independent Order of Foresters, operating as Foresters Financial, is a fraternal benefit society headquartered in Toronto, Ontario, Canada that provides life insurance and other financial solutions in Canada, the United Kingdom, and the United States. As of 2022, Louis Gagnon has served as the company’s President and CEO.

History
Foresters traces its origins to a British Friendly Society, a  mutual organization caring for the sick. Membership was originally gained by combat, first with quarterstaffs, then with swords and finally with cudgels, until initiation by combat was abandoned in 1843.

In 1834, the Royal Foresters formed a Friendly Society, the Ancient Order of Foresters (AOF). The IOF in the United States became independent of the AOF in 1874.

The expansion of the Independent Order of Foresters (IOF) into Canada in 1875 is attributed to a prominent doctor and community leader, Oronhyatekha. Of Mohawk descent, he was born in 1841 at Six Nations near present-day Brantford, Ontario, Oronhyatekha ("Burning Sky") was baptized Peter Martin and later attended Oxford, where he became a medical doctor.

Dr. Oronhyatekha held the office of Supreme Chief Ranger (now called "International Fraternal President") from 1879 until 1906; he died in 1907. Foresters membership reached 257,000 in 1906. Through the 20th century it amalgamated with various other fraternal organizations, including the Ontario part of one of the oldest, the Ancient Order of United Workmen, acquired in 1926, the Modern Brotherhood of America, acquired in 1931, and the Order of Scottish Clans, acquired in 1971.

Like other friendly societies and fraternal organizations of the time, Foresters helped transform the insurance industry by extending insurance benefits to the average working family. In addition to admitting women as full members, Foresters provided orphan benefits to the children of deceased Foresters members.

, Foresters supported various community causes in Canada, the US and UK, through direct investment in national and local community partnerships, branch funding and educational scholarships.

In partnership with nonprofit KaBOOM!, Foresters has helped build more than 150 playgrounds across the U.S. and Canada since 2006.

In April 2019, Macquarie Group’s investing division agreed to buy $12.3 billion in assets from Foresters Financial, including Foresters’ First Investors mutual funds business. In the same year, the company sold its U.S broker-dealer to Cetera Financial Group, in efforts to focus on life insurance.

In May 2019, Foresters sold its Canadian money management unit, Foresters Asset Management, to Fiera Capital Corp. In October 2019, the company sold Foresters Financial Holding and Foresters Life Insurance and Annuity Company to Nassau Financial Group.

In July 2021, Foresters invested in a capital project to transform the UK London Office. As part of Foresters sustainability roadmap, Renewable Energy Generation Assets and Energy Saving Products were utilised. The investment will reduce the CO₂ Emissions by up to 10,000kg per year.

Life insurance plans 
Foresters Financial offers a term life insurance policies: Term 10, Term 20, Term 30 and EZ term. Foresters Financial has 2 types of whole life insurance: Advantage Plus II whole life and Non-Par whole life.

Foresters Financial offers 2 critical illness insurance plans: Live Well and Live Well Plus. 

There are also multiple riders as well: Term riders, Spousal term riders, Child term rider, Accidental death benefits rider, and Disability waiver of premium rider.

Corporate structure
Foresters acquired Unity Life of Canada in 2008, which subsequently rebranded as Foresters Life Insurance Company in January 2012.

As of 2014, Foresters Financial operated a separate UK division based in South London.

In October 2020, Foresters Financial merged with life insurance distributor Canada Protection Plan. With the merger, Canada Protection Plan was rebranded as "Canada Protection Plan, a Foresters Financial company."

See also
 Ancient Order of Foresters 
 Independent Order of Odd Fellows (IOOF)
 Woodmen of the World

References

External links

Financial services companies established in 1874
Organizations established in 1874
Fraternal orders
Mutual organizations
Philanthropic organizations based in Canada
1874 establishments in Canada
Life insurance companies of Canada